The March Hare (called Haigha in Through the Looking-Glass) is a character most famous for appearing in the tea party scene in Lewis Carroll's 1865 book Alice's Adventures in Wonderland.

The main character, Alice, hypothesizes,

 "The March Hare will be much the most interesting, and perhaps as this is May it won't be raving mad – at least not so mad as it was in March."

"Mad as a March hare" is a common British English phrase, both now and in Carroll's time, and appears in John Heywood's collection of proverbs published in 1546. It is reported in The Annotated Alice by Martin Gardner that this proverb is based on popular belief about hares' behaviour at the beginning of the long breeding season, which lasts from February to September in Britain. Early in the season, unreceptive females often use their forelegs to repel overenthusiastic males. It used to be incorrectly believed that these bouts were between males fighting for breeding supremacy.

Like the character's friend, the Hatter, the March Hare feels compelled to always behave as though it is tea-time because the Hatter supposedly "murdered the time" whilst singing for the Queen of Hearts. Sir John Tenniel's illustration also shows him with straw on his head, a common way to depict madness in Victorian times. The March Hare later appears at the trial for the Knave of Hearts, and for a final time as "Haigha" (which is pronounced to rhyme with "mayor", according to Carroll, and a homophone of "hare" in a non-rhotic accent), the personal messenger to the White King in Through the Looking-Glass (Alice either does not recognize him as the March Hare of her earlier dream, or chooses not to comment about this).

Major depictions

Alice in Verse 

The major departure from Carroll's original here is that instead of appearing a jittery witness, the March Hare is cast as the Prosecutor. After the charge is read, the Hare addresses the court with an opening statement that more or less vindicates the accused, before turning his accusing eye upon the court itself for failing to serve tea with the evidence (the tarts).

Disney animated film 

Disney's Alice in Wonderland, an animated film, depicted the March Hare at the tea party as being deliriously confused. He repeatedly offers Alice a cup of tea, but distractedly pulls the cup out of her reach or takes it from her hands just as she is about to drink. He was voiced by Jerry Colonna, after whom his appearance and personality were modelled. He was animated by Ward Kimball.

This version of the character was also a semi-regular on Bonkers and one of the guests in House of Mouse, often seen seated with the Mad Hatter. During these appearances, the March Hare was voiced by Jesse Corti and Maurice LaMarche.

Tim Burton's Alice in Wonderland 

The March Hare appears in the 2010 Disney film Alice in Wonderland, voiced by Paul Whitehouse. His full name is Thackery Earwicket; this, however, is not mentioned in the film. In the movie, the March Hare behaves as if constantly nerve-wracked and completely delirious. He is a cook in the film, and the way he eccentrically throws dishes and pots suggests he is an amalgam of both the March Hare and the cook from Lewis Carroll's original book. The March Hare has a strong Scottish accent in this movie, while his friend the Mad Hatter (played by Johnny Depp) switches into a Scottish accent as well whenever his emotions are strained. He is first seen in the "Tea Party" scene, which takes place at his "Hare House" windmill. Thackery hosts a tea party, which he shares with Tarrant Hightopp the Mad Hatter, Mallymkun the Dormouse, and Chess the Cheshire Cat. He appears a second time in the White Queen's kitchen, frantically cooking and throwing dishes. His third appearance is at the Frabjous Day scene, in which he stands with the other characters wielding a ladle as his weapon, nervous and somewhat ready to go to battle. Burton stated that because Whitehouse is a great comedic actor, a lot of his lines came from improvisation.

The March Hare appears in the "Mad T Party" in Disney's California Adventure park. He is based on the 2010 film's interpretation, and plays bass guitar. He is often found hopping around with Mallymkun the Dormouse on stage.

In popular culture 
 The March Hare was played by Charlie Ruggles in Alice in Wonderland.
 In SyFy's TV Miniseries Alice, the March Hare is represented by the character Mad March.
 The March Hare is featured as the primary antagonist in the Once Upon a Time story "Tea Party in March" in the graphic novel Once Upon a Time: Out of the Past.
 In the song entitled "We Have Heaven" by the British rock group Yes, a lyric mantra is sung from beginning to end saying "Tell the Moon Dog, tell the March Hare...".
 In the game American McGee's Alice, the March Hare is portrayed as a victim of the Mad Hatter's insane experimentation. Both the Hare and the Dormouse have become clockwork cyborgs. He also appears in the sequel, Alice: Madness Returns where he and the Dormouse betray the Hatter to aid in the Dollmaker's plans by constructing the Infernal Train.
 In the video game adaptation of Tim Burton's Alice in Wonderland, Thackery Earwicket is a playable character. He uses his telekinesis to defeat the Bandersnatch.
 In the manga Alice in the Country of Hearts the March Hare is called Elliot March and is Blood Dupre's (the Hatter's) right-hand man. He isn't specifically crazy or mad, but has a quite violent attitude, almost killing Alice with his long-barrelled gun before being stopped by Blood.
 In the manga Pandora Hearts, the March Hare is a "Chain" whose "Contractor" is Reim Lunettes. It has the ability to fake death, which helps Reim to escape his attackers and proved to be so realistic that even his comrades have believed him really dead.
 In the Annette Ducharme song "Moral", she references the March Hare singing: "But you're frantic like the March Hare running round".

References

Rabbits and hares in literature
Anthropomorphic rabbits and hares
Fictional cyborgs
Fictional anthropomorphic characters
Lewis Carroll characters
Male characters in film
Male characters in literature
Literary characters introduced in 1865